Blenheim Park is an electoral ward of Southend-on-Sea covering the area west of Southend town centre. It is represented by three local government councillors, each elected to serve a four-year term.

Councillors

 Indicates Councillor elected that year.
 Indicates Councillor defected to the Conservatives.

Elections

2019 Southend Local Elections:Blenheim Park

No UKIP candidate as previous (-4.1).

Green candidate compared with 2016 election.

2018 Southend Local Elections:Blenheim Park

Floyd Waterworth defected from UKIP to the Conservatives before the election.

No Green candidate as previous (-4.2).

2016 Southend Local Elections:Blenheim Park

2015 Southend Local Elections:Blenheim Park

2014 Southend Local Elections:Blenheim Park

2012 Southend Local Elections:Blenheim Park

References

Electoral wards of Southend-on-Sea